is a 1997 Japanese direct-to-video yakuza film directed by Takashi Miike. It is the sequel to Ambition Without Honor (1996).

Plot
Tetsuya, a young yakuza, returns to his family after his adoptive father is wounded in an attack from a rival gang. Amid his battle against dishonorable enemies and corrupt yakuza politics he makes an unlikely ally in a rebel cop.

Cast

External links
 

1997 films
1990s Japanese-language films
Japanese sequel films
Yakuza films
Films directed by Takashi Miike
Japanese direct-to-video films
1990s Japanese films